Patrik-Gabriel Galchev (born 14 April 2001) is a Bulgarian professional footballer who plays mainly as left back for Levski Sofia.

Club career
Born in Spain to Bulgarian parents, Galchev began playing football at the age of 3. He spent 4 years at Real Zaragoza before returning to Bulgaria. After periods at Lokomotiv Sofia and DIT Sofia, Galchev signed with Levski Sofia youth academy, at the age of 14.  After impressing with the U-17 and U-19 teams, he spent a trial period at his hometown club Real Zaragoza. On 19 December 2019, he signed his first professional contract with Levski. He made his first team debut in a 4–1 win against Partizan Cherven Bryag in the Round of 32 of the 2020–21 Bulgarian Cup.

International career
Galchev has represented the Bulgaria under-18 national team. On 24 March 2021, he made his debut for the U-21 team in a 2−1 win over Ukraine.

Career statistics

Club

Honours

Club
Levski Sofia
 Bulgarian Cup (1): 2021–22

References

External links
 
 Profile at LevskiSofia.info

Living people
2001 births
Bulgarian footballers
Association football fullbacks
PFC Levski Sofia players